Þórsnes is the Old Norse for "Thor's headland". It may refer to:

Þórsnes, Iceland; see Stykkishólmur
Torsnes, Norway
Elise Thorsnes (born 1988), Norwegian footballer